Kevin Hanus (born 6 September 1993, in Nuremberg) is a German motorcycle racer who has previously competed at the Grand Prix level as well as in the IDM Moto3 Championship aboard a Honda NSF250R.

Career statistics

By season

Races by year

References

External links

Living people
1993 births
German motorcycle racers
125cc World Championship riders
Moto3 World Championship riders
Sportspeople from Nuremberg